Lieutenant-General Michael Reginald Dare DSO, OMM, CD (August 1, 1917 – May 22, 1996) was a Canadian Forces officer who became Vice Chief of the Defence Staff in Canada.

Career
Dare joined the Canadian Army as second lieutenant in the Dufferin and Haldimand Rifles in the 1930s. He served in World War II as an infantry officer in The Royal Canadian Regiment, then as a staff officer at Headquarters, 4th Canadian (Armoured) Division in Normandy and then, from September 1944, as brigade major, 4th Canadian (Armoured) Division, before being appointed, in March 1945, assistant adjutant and quartermaster-general at Headquarters, 4th Canadian (Armoured) Division. He went on to be Vice Chief of the Defence Staff in Canada in September 1969 before retiring in 1972.

After retiring from the army, Dare succeeded John Starnes as head of the RCMP Security Service in 1973.

He died in 1996 in Victoria, British Columbia.

References

1917 births
1996 deaths
Officers of the Order of Military Merit (Canada)
Vice Chiefs of the Defence Staff (Canada)
Canadian generals
Canadian Companions of the Distinguished Service Order
Military personnel from Montreal
Canadian Army personnel of World War II
Royal Canadian Regiment officers